Kenneth Bowen may refer to:

Kenny Bowen, mayor of Lafayette, Louisiana
Sgt. Kenneth Bowen, convicted in the Danziger Bridge shootings
Kenneth Bowen (tenor) (1932–2018), Welsh operatic and concert singer